National Secondary Route 145, or just Route 145 (or ) is a National Road Route of Costa Rica, located in the Guanacaste province.

Description
In Guanacaste province the route covers Abangares canton (Las Juntas, Sierra districts), Tilarán canton (Tilarán, Quebrada Grande, Cabeceras districts).

References

Highways in Costa Rica